Adegboyega Isiaka Oyetola (born 29 September 1954) is a Nigerian politician who served as governor of Osun State from 2018 to 2022. 

He contested for the Osun State gubernatorial seat on the platform of the All Progressives Congress (APC) in the September 2018 gubernatorial election and won. On 23 March 2019, a tribunal declared him to have not been legally returned and ordered INEC to issue certificates of return to Senator Adeleke of the PDP, which was contested at the Court of Appeal. Prior to his winning the election, he was the Chief of Staff to Rauf Aregbesola, his predecessor.

Early life and education
Adegboyega Oyetola was born in Iragbiji, Boripe Local Government Area of Osun State on 29 September 1954. He started his secondary education at Ifeoluwa Grammar School, Osogbo and graduated in 1972.

Oyetola proceeded to the University of Lagos and graduated with a Bachelor of Science honours degree in Insurance in 1978. He proceeded for his mandatory one year National Youth Service Corps (NYSC) in Potiskum, Yobe State, where he lectured at the Staff Training Centre between 1978 and 1979. He obtained his Master of Business Administration (MBA) from the University of Lagos in 1990.

Career
In 1980, Oyetola joined Leadway assurance company Limited as an area manager and worked there till 1987 when he moved on to join Crusader Insurance Company Limited as Underwriting Manager between 1987 and 1990. In 1990, he joined Alliance and General Insurance as Technical Controller and served in that capacity until 1991 when he left the organisation to start his own company, Silvertrust Insurance Brokers Limited. He was Managing Director since its founding until 2011 when he was appointed as Chief of Staff to the Osun State Governor, Rauf Aregbesola.

Oyetola also served as Executive Vice Chairman, Paragon Group of Companies between 2005 and 2011. He was also Chairman of Ebony Properties Limited. He had been a Director of Pyramid Securities Limited, until 2011, He is an Associate Member, Chartered Insurance Institute in London and Nigeria. He is also a member of the Nigeria Institute of Management (NIM).

Oyetola was a member of the Alliance for Democracy (AD), and has been in the party through its metamorphosis to Action Congress (AC), Action Congress of Nigeria (ACN) and now the All Progressives Congress (APC). In July 2018, he contested with Osun state House of Representatives deputy speaker Yusuf Lasun and Speaker of Osun State House of Assembly Rt. Hon. Najeem Folasayomi Salaam, Dr Samuel Ibiyemi; Publisher Nigerian News Direct Newspapers, Adelere Oriolowo, Moshood Adeoti amongst others for the All Progressives Congress gubernatorial candidacy of the 22 September 2018 gubernatorial election in Osun state and won. He was sworn in to office on 27 November 2018. On 22 March 2019, the Election tribunal sitting in Abuja declared that the All Progressive Congress and its candidate, Gboyega Oyetola, were not validly returned.

Pandora Papers revelations

As a result of the Pandora Papers leaks, the Premium Times reported on Oyetola's undisclosed acquisition of a London mansion from an international fugitive wanted for money laundering, Kola Aluko. The report revealed that an Oyetola-formed offshore company based in the British Virgin Islands, a known tax haven, had bought the house from another British Virgin Islands-based offshore company that was formed by Aluko right before Nigerian authorities were attempting to freeze Aluko's assets. The selling price, £9 million, was much lower than the £17 million that the house was judged to be worth by the Premium Times. Notably, this house is the residence of Bola Tinubu as he is in London for medical treatment.

References 

1954 births
Living people
Nigerian Muslims
University of Lagos alumni
Nigerian politicians
People from Osun State
Yoruba politicians